The Nash embedding theorems (or imbedding theorems), named after John Forbes Nash Jr., state that every Riemannian manifold can be isometrically embedded into some Euclidean space. Isometric means preserving the length of every path.  For instance, bending but neither stretching nor tearing a page of paper gives an isometric embedding of the page into Euclidean space because curves drawn on the page retain the same arclength however the page is bent.

The first theorem is for continuously differentiable (C1) embeddings and the second for embeddings that are analytic or smooth of class Ck, 3 ≤ k ≤ ∞. These two theorems are very different from each other. The first theorem has a very simple proof but leads to some counterintuitive conclusions, while the second theorem has a technical and counterintuitive proof but leads to a less surprising result.

The C1 theorem was published in 1954, the Ck-theorem in 1956. (A local version of this result was proved by Élie Cartan and Maurice Janet in the 1920s.) In the real analytic case, the smoothing operators (see below) in the Nash inverse function argument can be replaced by Cauchy estimates. Nash's proof of the Ck- case was later extrapolated into the h-principle and Nash–Moser implicit function theorem. A simpler proof of the second Nash embedding theorem was obtained by  who reduced the set of nonlinear partial differential equations to an elliptic system, to which the contraction mapping theorem could be applied.

Nash–Kuiper theorem ( embedding theorem) 
Given an -dimensional Riemannian manifold , an isometric embedding is a continuously differentiable topological embedding  such that the pullback of the Euclidean metric equals . In analytical terms, this may be viewed (relative to a smooth coordinate chart ) as a system of  many first-order partial differential equations for  unknown (real-valued) functions:

From this perspective, the existence of isometric embeddings given by the following theorem is considered surprising.
Nash–Kuiper theorem. Let  be an -dimensional Riemannian manifold and  a short smooth embedding (or immersion) into Euclidean space , where . This map is not required to be isometric.

The theorem was originally proved by John Nash with the stronger assumption . His method was modified by Nicolaas Kuiper to obtain the theorem above.

The isometric embeddings produced by the Nash–Kuiper theorem are often considered counterintuitive and pathological. They often fail to be smoothly differentiable. For example, a well-known theorem of David Hilbert asserts that the hyperbolic plane cannot be smoothly isometrically immersed into . For example, the image of any smooth isometric hypersurface immersion of the round sphere must itself be a round sphere. By contrast, the Nash–Kuiper theorem ensures the existence of continuously differentiable isometric hypersurface immersions of the round sphere which are arbitrarily close to (for instance) a topological embedding of the sphere as a small ellipsoid.

Any such embedding can be scaled by an arbitrarily small constant so as to become short, relative to any given Riemannian metric on the surface. It follows from the Nash–Kuiper theorem that there are continuously differentiable isometric embeddings of any such Riemannian surface where the radius of a circumscribed ball is arbitrarily small. Moreover, for any smooth (or even ) isometric embedding of an arbitrary closed Riemannian surface, there is a quantitative (positive) lower bound on the radius of a circumscribed ball in terms of the surface area and curvature of the embedded metric.

In higher dimension, as follows from the Whitney embedding theorem, the Nash–Kuiper theorem shows that any closed -dimensional Riemannian manifold admits an continuously differentiable isometric embedding into an arbitrarily small neighborhood in -dimensional Euclidean space. Although Whitney's theorem also applies to noncompact manifolds, such embeddings cannot simply be scaled by a small constant so as to become short. Nash proved that every -dimensional Riemannian manifold admits a continuously differentiable isometric embedding into .

At the time of Nash's work, his theorem was considered to be something of a mathematical curiosity. The result itself has not found major applications. However, Nash's method of proof was adapted by Camillo De Lellis and László Székelyhidi to construct low-regularity solutions, with prescribed kinetic energy, of the Euler equations from the mathematical study of fluid mechanics. In analytical terms, the Euler equations have a formal similarity to the isometric embedding equations, via the quadratic nonlinearity in the first derivatives of the unknown function. The ideas of Nash's proof were abstracted by Mikhael Gromov to the principle of convex integration, with a corresponding h-principle. This was applied by Stefan Müller and Vladimír Šverák to Hilbert's nineteenth problem, constructing minimizers of minimal differentiability in the calculus of variations.

Ck embedding theorem
The technical statement appearing in Nash's original paper is as follows: if M is a given m-dimensional Riemannian manifold (analytic or of class Ck, 3 ≤ k ≤ ∞), then there exists a number n (with n ≤ m(3m+11)/2, if M is a compact manifold n ≤ m(m+1)(3m+11)/2 if M is a non-compact manifold) and an isometric embedding ƒ: M → Rn (also analytic or of class Ck). That is ƒ is an embedding of Ck manifolds and for every point p of M, the derivative dƒp is a linear map from the tangent space TpM to Rn which is compatible with the given inner product on TpM and the standard dot product of Rn in the following sense:
 
for all vectors u, v in TpM.

The Nash embedding theorem is a global theorem in the sense that the whole manifold is embedded into Rn.  A local embedding theorem is much simpler and can be proved using the implicit function theorem of advanced calculus in a coordinate neighborhood of the manifold. The proof of the global embedding theorem relies on Nash's implicit function theorem for isometric embeddings. This theorem has been generalized by a number of other authors to abstract contexts, where it is known as Nash–Moser theorem. The basic idea in the proof of Nash's implicit function theorem is the use of Newton's method to construct solutions. The standard Newton's method fails to converge when applied to the system; Nash uses smoothing operators defined by convolution to make the Newton iteration converge: this is Newton's method with postconditioning.  The fact that this technique furnishes a solution is in itself an existence theorem and of independent interest. In other contexts, the convergence of the standard Newton's method had earlier been proved by Leonid Kantorovitch.

Notes

References 

 

 

 
 

 
 
 

Riemannian geometry
Riemannian manifolds
Theorems in Riemannian geometry